Renewal is the fifth studio album by American bluegrass musician Billy Strings, following Home. Released on September 24, 2021, the album peaked at number one on the Billboard Bluegrass Albums chart, making Renewal the second consecutive studio album by Billy Strings to do so.

The song "Red Daisy", one of the tracks on the album, was performed on Jimmy Kimmel Live! on 25 October 2021.

Overview and meaning
The last track on the album, "Leaders", tackles the subject of human rights. Other tracks on the album, such as "In the Morning Light" and "Love and Regret", focus on the subject of love and relationships.

The lengthiest track on the album, "Hide and Seek", features a chorus with the last text messages one of Billy Strings’ friends sent to him before committing suicide.

Reception
Matt Ruppert of No Depression stated "Though the musicality is the most automatically familiar part of Renewal, the songs themselves, built around Strings’ yearning vocals, stand up to and even match the exploratory music."

It was nominated for the Grammy Award for Best Bluegrass Album.

Track listing

References

2021 albums
Billy Strings albums
 Bluegrass albums